The Vanuatu National Statistics Office (VNSO) is Vanuatu's official statistical agency. The agency compiles and publishes statistics about the Pacific island nation.

See also
2009 Vanuatu Census
2016 Vanuatu Mini-Census (in response to Cyclone Pam)

References

External links
VNSO home page

Government of Vanuatu